Icebreaker Eisvogel (English: Kingfisher) is an icebreaker employed by the Port of Vienna, Austria.
Eisvogel clears ice in all three of Vienna's harbors. She is employed when the ice becomes a few centimetres in thickness.

In ice-free months the vessel is employed for official tours.

The German Navy built a 560-ton icebreaker, also named Eisvogel, which was sold off and is operated as a tugboat out of the port of Trieste.

References

Icebreakers of Austria
1955 ships
Ships of Austria